Edmond Modeste Lescarbault (1814, Châteaudun - 1894), was a French doctor and an amateur astronomer, best remembered for his 1859 supposed observation of the non-existent planet Vulcan.

He graduated and obtained his diploma in 1848. He then started to work as a doctor in Orgères-en-Beauce and worked there until 1872 (the street where he worked is now named after him). A keen astronomer, he built an observatory with a 3.75 inches (95 mm) refractor by his house and began correspondence with various scientific societies. On 26 March 1859 he saw a small object transiting the Sun and having heard of Le Verrier's theory of an intramercurial planet named Vulcan, he wrote a letter to the astronomer and was consequently visited by him in December 1859. Le Verrier announced the discovery on 2 January 1860. Lescarbault became Chevalier of the Légion d'honneur and was invited to appear before numerous learned societies.

His manuscripts, including correspondence with Camille Flammarion, are kept in Bibliothèque Municipale in Châteaudun. He died in 1894.

See also 
 Vulcan (hypothetical planet)
 Urbain Le Verrier

References

External links 
 About E. M. Lescarbault, with photos, in French

19th-century French astronomers
1814 births
1894 deaths
Chevaliers of the Légion d'honneur
People from Châteaudun